Carroll County is a county located in the state of Ohio. As of the 2020 census, the population was 26,721. Its county seat is Carrollton, while its largest village is Minerva. It is named for Charles Carroll of Carrollton, the last surviving signer of the Declaration of Independence.

Carroll County is part of the Canton-Massillon, OH Metropolitan Statistical Area, which is also included in the Cleveland-Akron-Canton, OH Combined Statistical Area. It is in the Appalachian Ohio region.

History
Carroll County was formed on December 25, 1832, from portions of Columbiana, Harrison, Jefferson, Stark, and Tuscarawas counties.

Carroll County lies upon an ancient trail known as the Great Trail, connecting the forks of the Ohio with Lake Erie and the inland plains.

Geography
It is the fifth smallest county in Ohio in land area and smallest in total area.

Adjacent counties
Columbiana County (northeast)
Jefferson County (southeast)
Harrison County (south)
Tuscarawas County (southwest)
Stark County (northwest)

Major highways

Demographics

2000 census
As of the census of 2000, there were 28,836 people, 11,126 households, and 8,155 families living in the county. The population density was 73 people per square mile (28/km2). There were 13,016 housing units at an average density of 33 per square mile (13/km2). The racial makeup of the county was 98.20% White, 0.54% Black or African American, 0.32% Native American, 0.11% Asian, 0.02% Pacific Islander, 0.09% from other races, and 0.71% from two or more races. 0.55% of the population were Hispanic or Latino of any race. 30.1% were of German, 13.5% American, 13.3% Irish, 9.8% English, and 6.6% Italian ancestry according to Census 2000.

There were 11,126 households, out of which 31.90% had children under the age of 18 living with them, 61.90% were married couples living together, 7.70% had a female householder with no husband present, and 26.70% were non-families. 22.90% of all households were made up of individuals, and 10.40% had someone living alone who was 65 years of age or older. The average household size was 2.56 and the average family size was 3.00.

In the county, the population was spread out, with 25.10% under the age of 18, 7.50% from 18 to 24, 27.50% from 25 to 44, 25.70% from 45 to 64, and 14.20% who were 65 years of age or older. The median age was 39 years. For every 100 females there were 98.00 males. For every 100 females age 18 and over, there were 95.40 males.

The median income for a household in the county was $35,509, and the median income for a family was $41,114. Males had a median income of $31,611 versus $21,285 for females. The per capita income for the county was $16,701. About 8.50% of families and 11.40% of the population were below the poverty line, including 17.20% of those under age 18 and 11.10% of those age 65 or over.

2010 census
As of the 2010 United States Census, there were 28,836 people, 11,385 households, and 8,067 families living in the county. The racial makeup of the county was 97.8% white, 0.5% black or African American, 0.3% American Indian, 0.2% Asian, 0.2% from other races, and 1.1% from two or more races. Those of Hispanic or Latino origin made up 0.8% of the population. In terms of ancestry, 29.2% were German, 14.4% were Irish, 11.3% were American, 9.8% were English, and 6.1% were Italian.

Of the 11,385 households, 29.8% had children under the age of 18 living with them, 57.4% were married couples living together, 8.8% had a female householder with no husband present, 29.1% were non-families, and 24.3% of all households were made up of individuals. The average household size was 2.50 and the average family size was 2.95. The median age was 43.1 years.

The median income for a household in the county was $43,148 and the median income for a family was $51,700. Males had a median income of $42,481 versus $26,587 for females. The per capita income for the county was $21,575. About 9.0% of families and 12.6% of the population were below the poverty line, including 18.7% of those under age 18 and 7.1% of those age 65 or over.

Politics
Carroll County is a Republican stronghold county. The only Democratic candidates to win the county were Woodrow Wilson in 1912, Lyndon B. Johnson in 1964 and Bill Clinton both in 1992 and 1996, but Jimmy Carter came within 85 votes of carrying it in 1976.

|}

Government

Carroll County officials

Carroll County judgeships

Ohio House of Representatives

Ohio State Senate

United States House of Representatives

United States Senate

Economy

Latest USDA data, (2007), show Carroll County led the state in nursery stock production, and was number ten among counties in the United States.

Carroll County leads the state in number of Utica Shale Oil Wells permitted or drilled.

Culture
The Great Trail Festival, a festival of old fashioned music, arts and crafts, is held near the village of Malvern each year at the end of August and the beginning of September. A celebration of Ohio's colonial history, the event focuses particularly on the region's Native American and French heritage, complete with a small herd of buffalo and battle reenactment.

The Algonquin Mill Fest  is another local festival. Held 4 miles south of Carrollton on SR 332 at the Algonquin Mill - a pioneer village with one room schoolhouse, steam-powered saw and flour mills, as well as several other historic buildings. Hand made arts and crafts are sold, along with flour milled during the festival, a pancake breakfast and chicken barbecue dinners.

Flight Fest in Malvern is a remote-control airplane competition.

Education

Public school districts

Brown Local School District
Carrollton Exempted Village School District
Conotton Valley Union Local School District

High schools

Carrollton High School
Conotton Valley High School
Malvern High School

Communities

Villages
Carrollton (county seat)
Dellroy
Leesville
Magnolia
Malvern
Minerva
Sherrodsville

Townships

Augusta
Brown
Center
East
Fox
Harrison
Lee
Loudon
Monroe
Orange
Perry
Rose
Union
Washington

Census-designated places
Lake Mohawk
Pekin

Unincorporated communities

Augusta
Harlem Springs
Kilgore
Leavittsville
Lindentree
Mechanicstown
Morges
New Harrisburg
Pattersonville
Petersburg
Scroggsfield
Wattsville

See also
National Register of Historic Places listings in Carroll County, Ohio

References

External links

County website
Carroll County Visitor's Bureau
Carroll County Historical Society 

 
Appalachian Ohio
Counties of Appalachia
1833 establishments in Ohio
Populated places established in 1833